Hollywood Hills High School is a high school in Hollywood, Florida.

Attendance zones
The school serves sections of Hollywood and Davie.

Small Learning Communities
Hollywood Hills High School contains "Small Learning Communities"

The School of Business and Human Services welcomes students who are interested in the fields of marketing, fashion, business management, culinary arts, childcare and education. Core subjects will incorporate business applications of the subject knowledge. All students selecting this SLC must take business systems and technology.
The School of Government and Communications welcomes students who would like to become translators, linguists, mediators, diplomats, lawyers, police or security officers, politicians, historians, government workers, journalists, T.V. producers or web designers.
It provides courses that are focused on cultural development and human interactions. All students in this SLC must take one of the following: geography, speech & debate or journalism.

The School of Liberal, Creative, and Performing Arts welcomes students interested in the creative production of ideas and the development of student talents. Core subjects encourage creative expression with an emphasis on matching a student's talents with possible career paths.
The School of Health, Science, and Engineering welcomes students interested in a career that involves problem solving, investigation, technical design, and/or one of the many medical related fields. Hands-on activities and experiential learning are incorporated into the core subjects. All students in the SLC must enroll in either anatomy and physiology or physics before graduation.

Clubs/extracurricular activities
JROTC
Art
TV Production (STV NEWS)
National Honor Society (NHS)
Spanish National Honor Society
Band (jazz, marching, symphonic)
Auxiliary (includes colorguard, dance team and twirlers/majorettes)
First Priority (Bible Club)
Best Buddies
Brain Brawl
Chorus
Debate Team
DECA
Drama Club
 Drill team
Future Florida Educators of America(FFEA)
French Club
Robotics
SADD/DFY-It
Spanish Club
Yearbook Staff
Newspaper Staff
Language Connection Tutoring Program
Peer Counseling
Math Club
SWAT
Japanese Fanatics
Literary Magazine (The Knot)
Principal's Advisory Council
Silver Knight
Tri-M Music Honor Society

County-sanctioned athletic programs 
Marching band (boys' and girls')
Basketball (boys' and girls')
Baseball (boys')
Cross country (boys' and girls')
American football (boys')
Flag football (girls') 
Soccer (boys' and girls')
Swimming (boys' and girls')
Track and field (boys' and girls')
Softball (girls')
Volleyball (boys' and girls')
Water polo (boys' and girls')
Wrestling (boys')
Cheerleading (girls'and boys')
(( LGBT Community Club))

Demographics
As of the 2021-22 school year, the total student enrollment was 1,766. The ethnic makeup of the school was 66% White, 26.9% Black, 51.6% Hispanic, 2.8% Asian, 0.2% Pacific Islander, 3% Multiracial, and 1.1% Native American or Native Alaskan.

Notable alumni
 Thurston Armbrister – professional football linebacker
 Bob Fallon – professional baseball pitcher
 Adam Gaynor – former member of Matchbox Twenty
 Alan Gelfand – inventor of the ollie skateboarding trick
 Bill Lindsey – professional baseball catcher
 Fred Melamed – actor
 Dexter Nottage – professional football defensive end
 Josh Samuda – professional football offensive guard
 Jabaal Sheard – professional football defensive end and Super Bowl LI champion
 Keith Uecker – professional football offensive lineman
 Robert Wexler – former U.S. Congressman from Florida

References

External links
 
 Hollywood Hills High School website at Archive.org
 Broward County Public Schools FCAT school grades (2002–2005) at Archive.org
 The School of Business and Human

Broward County Public Schools
High schools in Broward County, Florida
Public high schools in Florida
Buildings and structures in Hollywood, Florida
1968 establishments in Florida
Educational institutions established in 1968